Mitsino is a rural locality (a village) in Klyazminskoye Rural Settlement, Kovrovsky District, Vladimir Oblast, Russia. The population was 16 as of 2010.

Geography 
Mitsino is located 23 km southeast of Kovrov (the district's administrative centre) by road. Moshachikha is the nearest rural locality.

References 

Rural localities in Kovrovsky District